Fidel René Meza Cabrera (born 12 November 1943) is a Mexican politician affiliated with the National Action Party (formerly to the Institutional Revolutionary Party and the Party of the Democratic Revolution). As of 2014 he served as Deputy of the LIX Legislature of the Mexican Congress representing Puebla.

References

1943 births
Living people
21st-century Mexican politicians
Institutional Revolutionary Party politicians
Party of the Democratic Revolution politicians
National Action Party (Mexico) politicians
Meritorious Autonomous University of Puebla alumni
Politicians from Puebla
People from Huauchinango
Deputies of the LIX Legislature of Mexico
Members of the Chamber of Deputies (Mexico) for Puebla